Crassispira pseudocarinata is a species of sea snail, a marine gastropod mollusk in the family Pseudomelatomidae.

Description
The length of the shell attains 9 mm.

The whorls are concavely shouldered, somewhat indistinctly keeled. The keel is rendered nodulous by the ends of close obliquely longitudinal ribs, which are short, becoming evanescent about the middle of the body whorl, everywhere with close revolving grooves, which are somewhat nodulous. The color of the shell is yellowish brown.

Distribution
This marine species occurs off Tasmania

References

 Reeve, Lovell Augustus. Conchologia Iconica: Or, Illustrations of the Shells of Molluscous Animals: III. Reeve, 1845.

External links
 

pseudocarinata
Gastropods described in 1845
Gastropods of Australia